The Biak monarch (Symposiachrus brehmii), or Biak monarch flycatcher, is a species of bird in the family Monarchidae.
It is endemic to Biak Island, Indonesia.

Its natural habitat is subtropical or tropical moist lowland forests. It is threatened by habitat loss; the Biak monarch's habitat is affected by clearing forests for agricultural use and by logging. There are an estimated 2,500 to 9,999 adult birds of the species. If juvenile birds are included, the population may be between 3,500 and 15,000 individuals. Its population is decreasing.

Taxonomy and systematics
This species was originally placed in the genus Monarcha until moved to Symposiachrus in 2009.

Description
Biak monarchs measure 17 centimeters. Its heads, wings, throat, and central tail feathers are dark brown or black; its outer tail feathers, belly, breast, and rump are white. It also has a white patch on its wing. Some of the coloring may differ based on sex or age.

References

External links
BirdLife Species Factsheet.

Symposiachrus
Birds of the Schouten Islands
Birds described in 1871
Taxonomy articles created by Polbot
Endemic fauna of the Biak–Numfoor rain forests